Billy Wright (born 4 November 1962) is a former footballer who played as a striker. His senior career included stints with Burnley F.C. (England), Dundalk (Ireland) as well as National Soccer League clubs Blacktown City Demons, West Adelaide and Gippsland Falcons. Born in England, he represented the New Zealand national team at international level. 

Wright made his full debut for New Zealand in a 2–0 win over Saudi Arabia on 21 June 1988 and ended his international playing career having played 26 times for the All Whites, including 15 A-internationals in which he scored 9 goals, his final official cap being in a 1–0 loss to Australia on 30 May 1993. Wright has since moved to coaching where he has found his calling combining his talent and love of the game with his tough play style.

References

External links

1962 births
Living people
New Zealand association footballers
English footballers
Association football forwards
New Zealand international footballers
English Football League players
Cypriot First Division players
Burnley F.C. players
Crewe Alexandra F.C. players
Apollon Limassol FC players
Dundalk F.C. players
Blacktown City FC players
West Adelaide SC players
Gippsland Falcons players
University-Mount Wellington players
Miramar Rangers AFC players
Dandenong Thunder SC players
English expatriate footballers
English expatriate sportspeople in Cyprus
Expatriate footballers in Cyprus